Swandi Kitto is a former Singaporean footballer who played as a striker for the Singapore national team in the 1980s. At club level, he played for Ponggol Constituency, Tampines Rovers and Changi Constituency in the National Football League.

Swandi's son, Adam, is a playmaker who is under the youth academy of French club Metz and plays for the Singapore national team.

References 

Living people
Singaporean footballers
Singapore international footballers
Tampines Rovers FC players
Association football forwards
Year of birth missing (living people)